Kiselo i slatko is the fourth studio album by the Serbian garage rock/punk rock band Partibrejkers, released by PGP RTB in 1994.

Track listing 
All tracks written by Zoran Kostić and Nebojša Antonijević, except track 6 written by Milan Mladenović and track 7 written by Dime Todorov.

Personnel 
Partibrejkers
 Nebojša Antonijević "Anton" — guitar
 Zoran Kostić "Cane" — vocals

Additional personnel
 Vlada Negovanović — acoustic guitar, producer
 Branka Katić — backing vocals
 Srđan Gojković "Gile" — backing vocals
 Saša Vlajsović — bass
 Zoran Radomirović "Švaba" — bass
 Srđan Todorović — drums
 "Pera Joe" Miladinović — harmonica
 Saša Lokner — keyboards, 
 Goran Čavajda "Čavke" — percussion, backing vocals
 Borko Petrović — percussion, backing vocals
 Marin Petrić "Puroni" — percussion, backing vocals
 Milan Mladenović — vocals, harmonica
 Nenad Petrović — saxophone
 Aleksandar Kujučev — photography
 Zoran Marić — engineer
 Slavimir Stojanović — artwork by [design]
 Dušan Ercegovac — executive producer

References

External links
 Kiselo i slatko at Discogs

1994 albums
Partibrejkers albums
PGP-RTB albums